

Miku may refer to:

People
Miku (みく), the vocalist for the Japanese rock band An Cafe
, member of the Japanese rock band Band-Maid
Miku Ishida (未来), Japanese teen idol
Miku Itō (美来), Japanese voice actress
Miku Kanemura (美玖), Japanese singer and model
Miku Koide (未来), Japanese water polo player
Miku Makita, Canadian ice dancer
, Japanese mixed martial artist
Miku Tanabe (生来), Japanese idol
Miku Tashiro (未来), Japanese judoka
The nickname of Venezuelan footballer Nicolás Ladislao Fedor Flores

Fictional characters
 , virtual singer
 Miku Hinasaki (深紅), a character from the video game series Fatal Frame
 Miku Nekobe (美紅), a character from the manga Midori Days
 Miku Izayoi (誘宵 美九), a character in the Date a Live series
 Miku Imamura (今村 みく), a character in the show Denji Sentai Megaranger
 Miku Kohinata, a character in the show Senki Zesshou Symphogear
 Miku (390), a character in the anime Darling in the FRANXX
 Miku Nakano (中野ミク), a character in the anime/manga The Quintessential Quintuplets

Places
 Miku, Estonia, village in Meremäe Parish, Võru County, Estonia
 Miku, a mukim in Rembau District, Negeri Sembilan, Malaysia

Music
 Miku, a song by American chiptune-based pop and rock band Anamanaguchi

See also
 Metal Fighter Miku, a Japanese animated television series

Japanese feminine given names